Hochstetler is a surname originating in Switzerland, particularly in Bern-Mittelland.<ref>[http://www.verwandt.ch/karten/absolut/hostettler.html ''Absolute Verteilung des Namens 'Hostettler at verwandt.ch]</ref>

The current Swiss spelling of the name is Hostettler. Among non-Swiss there are a variety of spellings: Hochstetler, Hochstettler, Hostetler, Hostettler and Hochstedler are among the most common. Hochstetler is common among Amish and Mennonite families.

Notable people with the family name Hochstetler''' include:
Jacob Hochstetler, early Amish immigrant to North America
Thomas J. Hochstettler, president of Lewis & Clark College
Dallas Hostetler, originator of Tax Freedom Day
Dave Hostetler, former professional baseball player
Jeff Hostetler, former Super Bowl winning quarterback
John A. Hostetler, Amish and Mennonite historian
Joseph C. Hostetler, founding partner of Baker & Hostetler
John Hostettler, former member of United States House of Representatives representing Indiana 1995–2007

References

Amish
Surnames